Jonah 3 is the third chapter of the Book of Jonah in the Hebrew Bible or the Old Testament of the Christian Bible. This book contains the prophecies attributed to the prophet Jonah, and is a part of the Book of the Twelve Minor Prophets.

Text 
The original text was written in Hebrew language. This chapter is divided into 10 verses.

Textual versions

Some early manuscripts containing the text of this chapter in Hebrew are of the Masoretic Text tradition, which includes the Codex Cairensis (895), the Petersburg Codex of the Prophets (916), and Codex Leningradensis (1008). Fragments cumulatively containing all verses of this chapter in Hebrew were found among the Dead Sea Scrolls, including 4Q76 (4QXIIa; 150–125 BCE) with extant verse 2; 4Q82 (4QXIIg; 25 BCE) with extant verses 1–3; and Wadi Murabba'at Minor Prophets (Mur88; MurXIIProph; 75-100 CE) with extant verses 1–10.

There is also a translation into Koine Greek known as the Septuagint, made in the last few centuries BCE. Extant ancient manuscripts of the Septuagint version include Codex Vaticanus (B; B; 4th century), Codex Sinaiticus (S; BHK: S; 4th century), Codex Alexandrinus (A; A; 5th century) and Codex Marchalianus (Q; Q; 6th century). Some fragments containing parts of this chapter in Greek were found among the Dead Sea Scrolls, i.e., Naḥal Ḥever (8ḤevXIIgr; 1st century CE) with extant verses 2–5, 7–10.

Verse 1
 And the word of the Lord came unto Jonah the second time, saying,
 "The second time": Jonah is forgiven and restored to his office, while the commission formerly given is renewed. The beginning of the next verse, "arise," seems to imply that he was then in some settled home, perhaps at Gath-hepher.

Verse 3
 So Jonah arose, and went unto Nineveh, according to the word of the Lord.
 Now Nineveh was an exceeding great city of three days' journey.
 "Of three days' journey": that is 60 miles in circumference. Jonah speaks of the city's greatness, which was confirmed by other ancient writers, such as Diodorus Siculus, who describe Nineveh as 480 stadia in circumference (using Herodotus' definition of "a day's journey" to be "150 stadia" or about 19 miles, a "three days' journey" is about 450 stadia). The area (in form of parallelogram) of ancient Nineveh in Central Assyria borders Khorsabad in northeast, Koyunjik and Nebbi Yunus near the Tigris in northwest, Nimroud, between the Tigris and the Zab, in southwest; and Karamless, at a distance inland from the Zab, in southeast. The distance between Koyunjik and Nimroud is about 18 miles, as well as between Khorsabad and Karamless. It is 13 or 14 miles from Koyunjik to Khorsabad, and 14 miles from Nimroud to Karamless. The length (which was greater than the breadth) is comparable to Jonah 3:4, "a day's journey" (about 19 miles according to Herodotus as described above). Its walls were a hundred feet high, and could allow three chariots side-by-side, protected by more than 1500 lofty towers. The oldest palaces are found at Nimroud (probably the original site). Austen Henry Layard latterly has thought that the name Nineveh belonged originally to Koyunjik, rather than to Nimroud. Jonah (Jonah 4:11) mentions the children as numbering one hundred twenty thousand, which would give about a million to the whole population. Existing ruins show that Nineveh acquired its greatest extent under the kings of the second dynasty, that is, the kings mentioned in Scripture; it was then that Jonah visited it, and the reports of its magnificence were carried to the west [Layard]. According to the Jewish writers, a middling day's journey is ten "parsas", and every "parsa" makes four miles, so that with them it is forty miles: or else it was three days' journey in the length of it, as Kimchi thinks, from end to end.

Verse 6
 For word came unto the king of Nineveh,
 and he arose from his throne, 
 and he laid his robe from him, 
 and covered him with sackcloth,
 and sat in ashes.
 "For word came": ἤγγισεν ὁ λόγος, "the word came near" (Septuagint). The signs of penitence mentioned in verse 5 were not exhibited in obedience to any royal command, but rather through the impression made by the prophet as spread among the people, and then while they were showing their sorrow this manner, the news reached the king, and he put himself at the leader of it. The reigning monarch was probably either Shalmaneser III. or one of the two who succeeded him, Asshur-danil and Asshur-nirari, whose three reigns extended from 781 to 750 BC.
 "King of Nineveh": (Hebrew: melek nînĕveh) is found only here in the whole Old Testament, never observed in any contemporary documents. Most literature assumed it referring to the "king of the Assyrian empire". It is also very difficult to explain how an author writing centuries later could find Jonah's village and the name of his father yet did not know the usual designation for the Assyrian monarch ("king of Assyria"). At this time the northwest Semitic word for "king" (mlk), especially when associated with a city, often meant "governor" of a province rather than king over a nation. This is clearly displayed on a bilingual statue from Gozan, a western Assyrian province. This is the only text of any size so far discovered in both Aramaic and Assyrian. The Aramaic word mlk is regularly translated with the Assyrian šakin ("governor"). As early as 1909 S.R. Driver suggested that some of the unusual linguistic features in this work (which is not "pure, official, Jerusalem dialect") "might possibly be compatible with a pre-exilic origin in northern Israel". German archaeologist Walter Andrae found 135 stone monuments in the city of Aššur. Most of them are probably from the century just preceding the historical Jonah. Some of these stelae actually designate the governor of Nineveh by substantially the same cuneiform signs used on the bilingual statue. In one stele he is called the ‘governor of the city of Nineveh’ (no. 128) and on another the ‘governor of the province of Nineveh’ (no. 66). Both expressions could be expressed in Hebrew by the phrase ‘king of Nineveh’ (melek nînĕveh). Apparently in such contexts Assyrians did not carefully distinguish between a province or a city. The terms could be used interchangeably. The same basic phrasing occurs in the eponym lists. These are the names of Assyrian officials who had the honour of having the year named after them. Governors of Nineveh held this office in 789 and 761 BC. Their names were Ninurta-mukin-ahi and Nabu-mukinahi, respectively.
 "In ashes": Emblem of the deepest humiliation (Job 2:8; Ezekiel 27:30).

See also

 Jonah
 Nineveh
Related Bible parts: Jonah 1, Jonah 2

Notes

References

Sources

External links

Jewish
Jonah 3 Hebrew with Parallel English
Jonah 3 Hebrew with Rashi's Commentary

Christian
Jonah 3 English Translation with Parallel Latin Vulgate

03